Sara-Maria Schätzl (born 12 December 1987) is a German columnist, author, actress, and businesswoman.

Early life 
Sara Schätzl grew up in the small Bavarian town Donauwörth. She attended the boarding school Gymnasium Schloss Gaienhofen until she received the Mittlere Reife diploma at the age of sixteen, then dropped out of school and moved to Munich to start a career in the entertainment industry inspired by her role model Peter Alexander. As her parents didn't support her financially she moved first into a social housing apartment in Munich but in spring 2010 she relocated to a house with garden in the quieter Eching, where she lived with several animals, including three dogs, a cat and a horse, which she rescued from a horse dealer.

Poly Implant Prothèse scandal 
At the end of December 2011 Schätzl publicly admitted to be, like 16,000 other German women, affected by the scandal about unsafe breast implants made out of industrial silicone by the French company Poly Implant Prothèse. Schätzl could not remove her still intact PIP breast implants as a precaution (as recommended by Germany's Federal Institute for Drugs and Medical Devices) because she announced in January 2012 that she was five months pregnant and therefore did not want to take the risk of a general anaesthetic in fear of harming her unborn child. Schätzl raised awareness about the problems women with the toxic implants faced; however, she never sold her interviews about this issue or her pregnancy for money to the press but helped with her media partners several women, who couldn't afford the operation, to have their implants replaced for free.

Family 

After an unproblematic start to her pregnancy doctors noticed complications in the eighth month and her son Louis Tiger was born six weeks early by caesarean on 11 May 2012. While her premature baby had to stay in an incubator, Sara Schätzl was also in poor health condition (later diagnosed as myocardial inflammation due to an influenza during the fifth month of her pregnancy, which therefore could not be treated with antibiotics) and she could only leave the hospital with her son four weeks after the birth. When her then boyfriend of 14 months and the father of her son, the DJ and owner of the record label Jee-Productions Jerome Isma-Ae left her shortly after the birth of their son, she lived through a traumatic time she decided to move to Los Angeles and start a new life with her son in the United States. In August 2013 she received her green card attesting her permanent resident status in the United States as "Alien of extraordinary ability".

Career

Early years 
Schätzl started to get roles as an extra and supporting act in films and TV series like SOKO 5113 and the telenovela Lotta in Love. She made also commercials after she had already done her first at the age of ten.

German It-girl 
In 2007 photos appeared in the tabloid press showing the 19-year-old Schätzl as the alleged holiday flirt of actor Bernd Herzsprung during a joint stay in the hotel Liebes Rot Flüh in Haldensee, Tyrol in Austria. Later it came to light that the 65-year-old Herzsprung had arranged the 'paparazzi' pictures himself with the photographer and Schätzl after the separation from his wife Barbara Engel and he denied having a relationship with the young actress. Schätzl made also headlines for two court appearances in 2007 and 2008.

Sara Schätzl became an it girl and part of the Munich high society. In 2009 she started to write the column Zur Sache Schätzl! about unusual stories from Munich in the German tabloid Bild. Her first book Glamourgirl was published in November 2011 by Schwarzkopf & Schwarzkopf and tells in thirty-three stories her way from a small town country girl into the limelight in a big city.

A breakdown at the end of 2009 followed by bouts of depression forced Schätzl to take an eighteen-month break, during which she went to therapy, worked in her mother's travel agency in Sinzing and re-evaluated her life. During this time she also got tattoos on her arm and back including the life mottos Lebe frei und träume laut [live free and dream aloud] and Don't judge me, an image of the hamsa and some writing in Sanskrit.

Los Angeles 
In 2013 Schätzl moved with her son to Los Angeles to start her career as actress in Hollywood. After a report was aired on RTL program Punkt 12, her emigration in early 2013 and the process of establishing her career as an actress was followed by the TV station VOX in their series Auf und davon – Mein Auslandstagebuch and also documented in Schätzl's own video diary. A second episode of the RTL and VOX programmes following Schätzl's life in Los Angeles were filmed during autumn 2013 and was aired on VOX in January 2014.

Sara Schätzl studies acting at the Marjorie Ballentine Studio in Los Angeles.  In her first movie role Schätzl appears as Greta in the short film Doradus, written and directed by Fernando Scarpa, which was released 3 March 2014 and opened at the Philadelphia Independent Film Festival on 25 June 2014. The film's West Coast premiere was on the 12 July 2014 as an official selection of the Downtown Film Festival Los Angeles and the movie was also chosen for the Los Angeles Fear and Fantasy Film Festival 2014. In October 2014 Doradus won the HollyShorts Monthly Screening series audience vote.

In February 2015 Sara Schätzl published her second book Hungriges Herz [Hungry Heart], in which she describes her twelve-year-long fight against bulimia. Her illness began when she was fourteen years old suffering from low self-esteem. After she was hospitalized twice in 2014, once diagnosed with life-threatening cardiac arrhythmias, she decided to start a therapy and join a support group in Los Angeles. In the last months of her therapy Schätzl used her diary notes, together with records from her mother and friends, to write a book about her life with the eating disorder and her battle to escape the addiction. After Hungriges Herz became a bestseller in Germany Schätzl started in May 2015 a project on Kickstarter to collect $35000 to produce a short documentary film, ADDICT, based on the book and show the film for free in schools to discuss the problem of eating disorders with young people. The project ended on 21 May 2015 unsuccessfully.

In October 2015 Schätzl was featured as successful business woman in the Erfolgsmenschen series of the German news magazine Stern. She started together with a friend an expanding club promotion business and is the only female promoter in Los Angeles.

Las Vegas
At the beginning of 2016 Schätzl moved from Los Angeles to Las Vegas. Her move was followed by a German TV production.

In the summer of 2016 she started a cooperation, called Bottles of kindness, with the Croatian company Eva Maria Cosmetics to promote awareness of autism.

At the end of 2016, Schätzl changed career and opened a small bed and breakfast in four luxury trailers parked in the backyard of her Las Vegas house to have more time to look after her son, who was diagnosed with autism. A documentary about the renovation of her house, which she did herself with the help of members of a rehabilitation program, as well as the set-up and opening of the trailer hotel was aired on German TV in January 2017.

Laughing Helps foundation

In 2013 Schätzl started the charity Laughing Helps, which aims to help homeless people in Los Angeles. Videos posted by her on YouTube earn money from sponsors depending on the number of viewers and subscribers a video receives and which is directly donated to the people in need.

TV appearances
Talk and reality shows
 Das perfekte Promi-Dinner (2011, VOX)
 Markus Lanz (2012, ZDF, Talkshow hosted by Markus Lanz)
 Anne Will (2012, ARD, Talkshow hosted by Anne Will)
 Mieten, kaufen, wohnen (2012, VOX)
 Auf und davon – Mein Auslandstagebuch (2013, VOX)
 Auf und davon (2014, VOX)
 Taff (2015, Pro7)
 Taff (2016, Pro7, "Sara Schätzl – What happens in Vegas", five episodes)
 Punkt 12 (2017, RTL)
Commercial
 We Love to Entertain You (as Tanja, Pro7)

Filmography

Publications 
Column
 Zur Sache Schätzl (2010, Bild)
Books
 Glamourgirl (2011)
 Hungriges Herz (2015)

External links

 Official Website
 Official Facebook page
 Sara Schätzl introduces her book Glamourgirl (video)
 Official Youtube channel
 Laughing Helps Foundation channel

References

Living people
1987 births
20th-century German writers
21st-century German writers
German bloggers
German television actresses
German women bloggers
20th-century German women writers
21st-century German women writers
German columnists
German women columnists